Fishing Party may refer to:
Fishing Party (Australia)
Fishing Party (Scotland)